James Alexander Calder  (September 17, 1868 – July 20, 1956) was a Canadian politician.

Biography
Born in Oxford County, Ontario, he received his Bachelor of Arts degree from the University of Manitoba in 1888. He was a teacher and principal, before being elected to the Legislative Assembly of Saskatchewan for the riding of South Regina in the 1905 provincial election. A Liberal, he was re-elected in a 1908 by-election and in the 1912 election. From 1905 to 1912, he was the Minister of Education, Provincial Treasurer, and Minister of Railways. The rural village of Calder, SK was named after him when it was incorporated in 1911. From 1916 to 1917, he was the President of the Executive Council, Minister of Railways, and Minister of Highways.

He was elected as a Unionist candidate to the House of Commons of Canada for the riding of Moose Jaw in the 1917 federal election. He held many ministerial positions including Minister of Immigration and Colonization, Minister of Agriculture (Acting), Minister of Militia and Defence (Acting), President of the Privy Council, and Minister presiding over the Department of Health.

In 1921 James Calder used his position to silence one of the first critics of Residential Schools , Dr P.H. Bryce M.A., M.D., author of Record of the Health Conditions of the Indians of Canada from 1904 to 1921. Dr Bryce had been appalled by the death toll tuberculosis had levelled on the children attending these schools over the previous decades and had advocated intently to improve these conditions and lower a mortality rate exponentially higher than Canadians of European descent. James Calder used his position to force Dr Bryce into an unwanted retirement and was able to silence his advocacy that may have saved innumerable lives.

In 1921, he was called to the Canadian Senate, appointed on the advice of The Rt. Hon. Arthur Meighen, representing the senatorial division of Moose Jaw, Saskatchewan. A Conservative (and later Progressive Conservative), he died in office in 1956.

Philately
Outside politics, Calder was a noted philatelist who signed the Roll of Distinguished Philatelists in 1947.

Electoral history

|-

 
|Provincial Rights
|James Benjamin Hawkes
|align="right"|800
|align="right"|47.85%
|align="right"|–
|- bgcolor="white"
!align="left" colspan=3|Total
!align="right"|1,672
!align="right"|100.00%
!align="right"|

|-
 
|style="width: 130px"|Provincial Rights
|Albert Eugene Whitmore
|align="right"|1,097
|align="right"|51.55%
|align="right"|+3.70

|- bgcolor="white"
!align="left" colspan=3|Total
!align="right"|2,128
!align="right"|100.00%
!align="right"|

|-

|Independent
|Hugh Alexander Green
|align="right"|254
|align="right"|18.75%
|align="right"|–
|- bgcolor="white"
!align="left" colspan=3|Total
!align="right"|1,355
!align="right"|100.00%
!align="right"|

|-

 
|Conservative
|James Nixon
|align="right"|475
|align="right"|25.93%
|align="right"|-
|- bgcolor="white"
!align="left" colspan=3|Total
!align="right"|1,832
!align="right"|100.00%
!align="right"|

|-

 
|Conservative
|Henry Leppington
|align="right"|1,095
|align="right"|28.86%
|align="right"|+2.93
|- bgcolor="white"
!align="left" colspan=3|Total
!align="right"|3,794
!align="right"|100.00%
!align="right"|

|-

|Opposition-Labour
|SOMERVILLE, James ||align=right|2,946

References and sources
References

Sources

 
  
  
 

The Story of a National Crime Being a Record of the Health Conditions of the Indians of Canada from 1904 to 1921, by Dr. P. H. Bryce, M.A., M.D. Chief Medical Officer of the Indian Department
https://archive.org/details/storyofnationalc00brycuoft/page/n7/mode/2up

1868 births
1956 deaths
Canadian senators from Saskatchewan
Conservative Party of Canada (1867–1942) senators
Members of the House of Commons of Canada from Saskatchewan
Members of the King's Privy Council for Canada
People from Oxford County, Ontario
Progressive Conservative Party of Canada senators
Saskatchewan Liberal Party MLAs
Unionist Party (Canada) MPs
University of Manitoba alumni
Canadian philatelists
Signatories to the Roll of Distinguished Philatelists